Socialist Alternative is the Finnish section of International Socialist Alternative. Founded in 2002, it is active in Helsinki, Turku and Oulu. The name in English is Socialist Alternative, the same as the CWI (now ISA) section in the USA which has attracted some attention in Finland.

References

External links
International Socialist Alternative: Section links

2002 establishments in Finland
Communist parties in Finland
Political parties established in 2002
Finland
Trotskyist organizations in Europe